Linz-Bindermichl is a suburb of Linz in Upper Austria, which was the site of a post World War II American sector displaced person camp.

External links 
 https://web.archive.org/web/20081107023256/http://www.ushmm.org/museum/exhibit/online/dp/camp9a.htm
 Historic pictures of Linz (German)
 German audioguide through Bindermichl

Linz